Henry Payne may refer to:

Henry Clay Payne (1843–1904), U.S. Postmaster
Henry B. Payne (1810–1896), congressman and senator from Ohio
Henry Payne (artist) (1868–1940), English Arts and Crafts artist
Henry Nevil Payne (died c. 1710), British dramatist and Roman Catholic agitator
Henry Payne (cartoonist) (born 1962), editorial cartoonist for The Detroit News and United Media
Henry Payne (engineer) (1871–1945), Australian engineer and academic
Henry Payne (MP), member of parliament for Wallingford

See also
Harry Payne (disambiguation)